The Federal Aviation Regulations (FARs) are rules prescribed by the Federal Aviation Administration (FAA) governing all aviation activities in the United States. The FARs comprise Title 14 of the Code of Federal Regulations (CFR). A wide variety of activities are regulated, such as aircraft design and maintenance, typical airline flights, pilot training activities, hot-air ballooning, lighter-than-air aircraft, man-made structure heights, obstruction lighting and marking, model rocket launches, commercial space operations, model aircraft operations, Unmanned Aircraft Systems (UAS) and kite flying. The rules are designed to promote safe aviation, protecting pilots, flight attendants, passengers and the general public from unnecessary risk.

FAR vs. 14 CFR

Since 1958, these rules have typically been referred to as "FARs", short for Federal Aviation Regulations. However, another set of regulations (Title 48) is titled "Federal Acquisitions Regulations", and this has led to confusion with the use of the acronym "FAR". Therefore, the FAA began to refer to specific regulations by the term "14 CFR part XX".

FAA Order 1320.46C (Advisory Circular System) section 10 (Using references in the text of an AC) para. h explains "Do not use the acronym "FAR" to refer to FAA's regulations. Neither the Department of Transportation nor the Office of the Federal Register allow us to use "FAR" for our regulations. The Federal Acquisition Regulations apply government-wide and are allowed to use the acronym "FAR.""

14 CFR Overview
Title 14 CFR - Aeronautics and Space is one of the fifty titles that make up the United States Code of Federal Regulations (CFR). Title 14 is the principal set of rules and regulations (sometimes called administrative law) issued by the Department of Transportation and Federal Aviation Administration, federal agencies of the United States which oversee Aeronautics and Space. This title is available in digital and printed form, and can be referenced online using the Electronic Code of Federal Regulations (e-CFR).

Content as of 2018 

The table of contents, as reflected in the e-CFR updated December 20, 2018:

Organization 
Each title of the CFR is organized into sections, called parts. Each part deals with a specific type of activity. For example, 14 CFR Part 141 contains rules for pilot training schools. The sections most relevant to aircraft pilots and AMTs (Aviation Maintenance Technicians) are listed below.  Many of the FARs are designed to regulate certification of pilots, schools, or aircraft rather than the operation of airplanes. Once an airplane design is certified using some parts of these regulations, it is certified regardless of whether the regulations change in the future. For that reason, newer planes are certified using newer versions of the FARs, and in many aspects may be thus considered safer designs.

 Part 1 – Definitions and Abbreviations
 Part 13 – Investigation and Enforcement Procedures
 Part 21 – Certification Procedures for Products and Parts
 Part 23 – Airworthiness Standards: Normal, Utility, Acrobatic and Commuter Airplanes
 Part 25 – Airworthiness Standards: Transport Category Airplanes
 Part 27 – Airworthiness Standards: Normal Category Rotorcraft
 Part 29 – Airworthiness Standards: Transport Category Rotorcraft
 Part 33 – Airworthiness Standards: Aircraft Engines
 Part 34 – Fuel Venting and Exhaust Emission Requirements for Turbine Engine Powered Airplanes
 Part 35 – Airworthiness Standards: Propellers
 Part 36 – Noise Standards: Aircraft Type and Airworthiness Certification
 Part 39 – Airworthiness Directives
 Part 43 – Maintenance, Preventive Maintenance, Rebuilding, and Alteration
 Part 45 - Identification and Registration Marking
 Part 48 – Registration and Marking Requirements for Small Unmanned Aircraft
 Part 61 – Certification: Pilots, Flight Instructors, and Ground Instructors
 Part 63 – Certification: Flight Crewmembers Other Than Pilots
 Part 65 – Certification: Airmen Other Than Flight Crewmembers
 Part 67 – Medical Standards and Certification
 Part 68 – Requirements for Operating Certain Small Aircraft without a Medical Certificate
 Part 71 – Designation of Class A, Class B, Class C, Class D, and Class E Airspace Areas; Airways; Routes; and Reporting Points
 Part 73 – Special Use Airspace
 Part 91 – General Operating and Flight Rules
 Part 97 – Standard Instrument Approach Procedures
 Part 101 – Moored Balloons, Kites, Unmanned Rockets, Unmanned Free Balloons, and Certain Model Aircraft
 Part 103 – Ultralight Vehicles
 Part 105 – Parachute Operations
 Part 107 – Small Unmanned Aircraft Systems
 Part 117 – Flight and Duty Limitations and Rest Requirements: Flightcrew Members
 Part 119 – Certification: Air Carriers and Commercial Operators
 Part 121 – Operating Requirements: Domestic, Flag, and Supplemental Operations
 Part 125 – Certification and Operations: Airplanes Having a Seating Capacity of 20 or More Passengers or a Payload Capacity of 6,000 Pounds or More
 Part 129 – Operations: Foreign Air Carriers and Foreign Operators of U.S. Registered Aircraft Engaged in Common Carriage
 Part 133 – Rotorcraft External-Load Operations
 Part 135 – Operating Requirements: Commuter and On Demand Operations and Rules Governing Persons on Board Such Aircraft
 Part 136 – Commercial Air Tours and National Parks Air Tour Management
 Part 137 – Agricultural Aircraft Operations
 Part 139 – Certification of Airports
 Part 141 – Flight Schools
 Part 142 – Training Centers
 Part 145 – Repair Stations
 Part 147 – Aviation Maintenance Technicians Schools
 Part 183 – Representatives of The Administrator
 Part 298 – Exemptions for air taxi and commuter air carrier operations

Regulations of interest

The FARs have tens of thousands of separate sections, many used by large numbers of researchers on any given day. A few of the regulations particularly relevant to laypersons, to political issues, or of historical interest are listed here.

Part 1
Many other FARs depend on definitions, which are found in Part 1.1

Part 21
This part prescribes:
(1) Procedural requirements for issuing and changing:
(i) Design approvals;
(ii) Production approvals;
(iii) Airworthiness certificates;
(iv) Airworthiness approvals;
(2) Rules governing applicants for, and holders of, any approval or certificate specified above
(3) Procedural requirements for the approval of articles.

Part 23
Part 23 contains airworthiness standards required for issuance and change of type certificates for airplanes in these categories :
 nine or less passengers, 12,500 pounds or less MTOW :
 normal : nonacrobatic operation (bank angle < 60°);
 utility : limited acrobatic operation (60° < bank angle < 90°);
 acrobatic : no restrictions
 commuter category: multiengine airplanes, 19 or less passengers, 19,000 pounds or less MTOW, nonacrobatic operation (bank angle < 60°).

In 2016 the FAA proposed a new system of performance-based airworthiness standards instead of prescriptive design requirements. The familiar weight and propulsion classifications of small airplane regulations would be replaced by performance and risk-based standards for aircraft weighing less than 19,000 pounds and seating 19 or fewer passengers. On August 30, 2017, a revised Part 23 ruling went into effect, changing the aircraft classifications. The new passenger classifications are: Level 1, seating for 0 to 1 passenger; Level 2, 2 to 6; Level 3, 7 to 9; Level 4, 10 to 19. Speed classifications are: low speed, Vc or Vmo equal to or less than 250 knots CAS and equal to or less than Mmo 0.6 Mach; high speed, Vc or Vmo greater than 250 knots CAS and Mmo greater than 0.6 Mach.

Prior to August 30, 2017, Part 23 had a large number of regulations to ensure airworthiness in areas such as structural loads, airframe, performance, stability, controllability, and safety mechanisms, how the seats must be constructed, oxygen and air pressurization systems, fire prevention, escape hatches, flight management procedures, flight control communications, emergency landing procedures, and other limitations, as well as testing of all the systems of the aircraft.

It also determined special aspects of aircraft performance such as stall speed (e.g., for single engine airplanes – not more than 61 knots), rate of climb (not less than 300 ft/min), take-off speed (not less than 1.2 x VS1), and weight of each pilot and passenger (170 lb for airplanes in the normal and commuter categories, and 190 lb for airplanes in the acrobatic and utility categories).

The Cessna 177, Cirrus SR20 and Piper PA-34 Seneca are well-known airplanes types that were certified to standards set out in FAR Part 23.

Most of the Federal Aviation Regulations, including Part 23, commenced on February 1, 1965.  Prior to that date, airworthiness standards for airplanes in the normal, utility and acrobatic categories were promulgated in Part 3 of the US Civil Air Regulations. Many well-known types of light airplane, like the Cessna 150 and Piper Cherokee are certified to these older standards, even though they remained in production after 1965.

Part 25

This part contains airworthiness standards for airplanes in the transport category. The Boeing 737 and later types, and Airbus A300 series, are well-known airplane types that were certified according to standards set out in FAR Part 25. Transport category airplanes are either:

This Part is organized into six subparts, to specify design criteria for each of
 A - General
 B - Flight
 C - Structure
 D - Design and Construction
 E - Powerplant
 F - Equipment

For example, Part 25, Subpart D has section headings for
 General
 Control Surfaces
 Control Systems
 Landing Gear
 Floats and Hulls
 Personnel and Cargo Accommodations
 Emergency Provisions
 Ventilation and Heating
 Pressurization
 Fire Protection
 Miscellaneous

Most of the Federal Aviation Regulations, including Part 25, commenced on February 1, 1965.  Prior to that date, airworthiness standards for airplanes in the transport category were promulgated in Part 4b of the US Civil Air Regulations which was in effect by November 1945. Effective August 27, 1957, Special Civil Air Regulation (SR) 422 was the basis for certification of the first turbine-powered transport airplanes, such as the Boeing 707, the Lockheed Electra, and the Fairchild 27. SR 422A became effective July 2, 1958, and was superseded by SR 422B, effective August 29, 1959. Only a few airplanes were certified under SR 422A, such as the Gulfstream I and the CL-44. First generation turbine-powered transport category airplanes such as the DC-8, DC-9, and B-727, were originally certified under SR 422B. SR 422B was recodified with minor changes to 14 CFR part 25, which became effective February 1965.

Part 27
This part contains airworthiness standards for rotorcraft in the normal category. Rotorcraft up to 7,000 lb Maximum takeoff weight and 9 or fewer passengers are type certified in this part.

Examples of rotorcraft certified in this part are the Robinson R44, Schweizer 300 and the Bell 429.

Part 29
This part contains airworthiness standards for rotorcraft in the transport category. Rotorcraft with more than  maximum takeoff weight and 10 or more passengers are type certified in this part. Rotorcraft with more than  maximum takeoff weight must be certified to additional Category A standards defined in this part.

Part 91
Part 91 defines a Part 91 Operator. These are the regulations that define the operation of small non-commercial aircraft within the United States, however, many other countries defer to these rules. These rules set conditions, such as weather, under which the aircraft may operate.

Section 91.3(b)

This regulation states that the pilot-in-command is the party directly responsible for, and is the final authority as to, an aircraft being operated.

Additionally, this regulation states that in an emergency requiring immediate action, the pilot-in-command may deviate from any regulation contained within Part 91 to the extent required to handle the emergency.

Temporary flight restrictions

The pertinent sections of the FAR (14 CFR Sections 91.137, 91.138, 91.139, 91.141, 91.143, 91.145, 99.7) describe temporary flight restrictions (TFR). A TFR is a geographically-limited, short-term, airspace restriction, typically in the United States. Temporary flight restrictions often encompass major sporting events, natural disaster areas, air shows, space launches, and Presidential movements. Before the September 11, 2001 attacks, most TFRs were in the interest of safety to flying aircraft with occasional small restrictions for Presidential movements. Since 9/11, TFRs have been routinely used to restrict airspace for 30 nautical miles around the President, with a  radius no-fly zone for non-scheduled flights. They are also available to other high-profile figures such as presidential and vice-presidential candidates (though not all do so, as Senator John Kerry, who did not ask for any TFR during the 2004 election).

TFRs are deeply unpopular with pilots in the general aviation sector. Presidential TFRs are nearly 70 miles in diameter, and frequently close off not only the airport Air Force One is using but nearby airports as well. Others, including the Transportation Security Administration, argue that they are necessary for national security. TFRs can also be instituted for special military operations, such as with the 2023 Chinese balloon incident, where the FAA put into place one of the largest airspace restrictions in U.S. history, with an area approximately twice the size of Massachusetts and more than five times the restricted airspace surrounding Washington, D.C.

The responsibility for screening requests for TFR and for subsequent granting or denying them, lies with the FAA's Office of System Operations Security.

Two-way radio communications failure

Section 91.185 of the Federal Aviation Restrictions deals with loss of radio communications while in flight. 
If a loss of radio communications were to be encountered during VFR conditions, or if VFR conditions are encountered after loss of communication with the ground and other aircraft, the pilot of the aircraft shall continue the flight under VFR and land as soon as practicable.
If, however, the failure occurs in IFR conditions and/or the VFR conditions are not forthcoming, the pilot should continue under the following conditions:
 Route – The pilot will follow:
 The route assigned in the last contact with ATC before loss of communication, or, if being radar vectored, continue direct to the radar fix specified in the vector clearance;
 In the absence of an assigned route, the pilot will follow the route advised by ATC;
 In the absence of an ATC assigned or advised route, the pilot will follow the route set down in the flight plan.

 Altitude – The pilot will continue at the highest of the following altitudes or flight levels:
 The altitude assigned in the last contact with ATC before loss of communication;
 The minimum altitude for IFR operations;
 The altitude advised by ATC to be expected in a further clearance.

Part 121
Part 121 defines a Part 121 Operator. These are generally large airlines, regional air carriers, and all cargo operators.

Part 135 
Part 135 defines a Part 135 Operator. These regulations define on-demand, unscheduled air service for passengers or freight.

Private, commuter, and commercial operations

For all pilots, there is an important distinction in the parts that address classes of flight. These parts do not distinguish type of aircraft, but rather type of activity done with the aircraft. Regulations for commuter and commercial aviation are far more intensive than those for general aviation, and specific training is required. Hence, flights are often referred to as Part XX operations, to specify which one of the different sets of rules applies in a particular case. Also, flight schools will often designate themselves as Part 61 or Part 141 to distinguish between different levels of training and different study programs they could offer to the students.

Part 61 is certification for all pilots, flight instructors, and ground instructors.

Part 63 is certification for flight crewmembers other than pilots; such as flight engineers and flight navigators.

Part 65 is certification for airmen other than flight crewmembers; such as Air Traffic Control Tower Operators, Aircraft Dispatchers, Mechanics, Repairmen and Parachute Riggers.

Part 91 is general operating rules for all aircraft. General aviation flights are conducted under this part. Part 91, Subpart (K) prescribes operating rules for fractional ownership programs.

Part 107 (FAA sUAS Part 107) specifies regulations to fly under the Small UAS Rule, or small unmanned aircraft systems in the National Airspace System (NAS). Small unmanned aircraft systems (sUAS) are those that weigh less than 55 pounds.

Part 117 specifies flight and duty-time limitations and rest requirements for flightcrew members.

Part 121 is scheduled air carrier (airliners).

Part 133 is external load (helicopter) operations.

Part 135 is a set of rules with more stringent standards for commuter and on-demand operations. Part 135 operator rules govern commercial aircraft.
Part 135 which is titled "Operating Requirements: Commuter and On Demand Operations and Rules Governing Persons On Board Such Aircraft" applies to turbojet engine powered aircraft with 1-30 seats, non-transport category turbo-propeller powered aircraft with 10-19 seats, and transport category turbo props with 20-30 seats. Applicants for a Part 135 certificate must have exclusive use of at least one aircraft.

Part 141 is a more structured method for pilot training, based on FAA syllabus and other standards.

Maintenance

Part 21 is certification procedures for products and parts.

Part 39 are airworthiness directives.

Part 43 is maintenance, preventive maintenance, rebuilding, and alteration.

Part 145 contains the rules a certificated repair station must follow as well as any person who holds, or is required to hold, a repair station certificate issued under this part.

Charter

Part 380 applies to Public Charter air transportation of passengers in interstate or foreign air transportation; whether furnished by a certificated commuter or foreign air carrier, or an air taxi operator, that directly engages in the operation of aircraft; or Public Charter operators

See also
 Airspace
 Flight permits
 Day-night average sound level
 Joint Aviation Requirements
 National Security Area
 Night aviation regulations
 Prohibited airspace
 Restricted airspace
 Safety pilot
 Special flight rules area
 Special use airspace
 Transport category

References

External links 
 Dynamic Regulatory System - A comprehensive collection of regulatory guidance material
 14 CFR – Title 14—Aeronautics and Space – Legal Information Institute
 FAR/AIM.org – Online FAR/AIM and other freely available FAA documentation

Code of Federal Regulations
Transportation in the United States
Federal Aviation Administration
Aviation in the United States
Aviation law